Dərəkənd or Derekend or Darakend may refer to:
Dzoragyugh, Lori, Armenia
Dərəkənd, Gobustan, Azerbaijan
Dərəkənd, Khojavend, Azerbaijan
Dərəkənd, Nakhchivan, Azerbaijan